Kimberley Yvette "Kim" Oden (born May 6, 1964 in Birmingham, Alabama) is a former USA National volleyball player. She was part of the United States women's national volleyball team.

Biography
She graduated from Stanford in 1986 with a degree in Public Policy, and then went on to play on the U.S. National Team (1986–92, '94). She was named Olympic team captain in 1988 and 1992. In 1985, she won the Honda-Broderick Award (now the Honda Sports Award) as the nation's best female collegiate volleyball player.

At the 1988 Seoul Summer Olympics, Oden was voted "Best Hitter," tallying the highest hitting percentage during the games.

In 1992, she was on the U.S. women's team that won a bronze medal at the Barcelona Summer Olympics in Spain. She participated at the 1994 FIVB Volleyball Women's World Championship, and at the 1990 FIVB Volleyball Women's World Championship. On club level she played with Stanford University.

Oden was the head volleyball coach at Saint Francis High School in Mountain View, California During her four years coaching there, she recorded 100 wins and only 34 losses which took her teams to many CCS and Nor Cal Finals. Today, she is the Guidance and Counseling Director at the high school and occasionally announces Stanford volleyball matches.

Originally a Southern California resident of Irvine, Oden now resides in Palo Alto.  Her sisters Elaina and Beverly were also outstanding volleyball players.

Awards
 Three-time All-American
 National Player of the Year in 1984 and 1985
Honda-Broderick Award in 1985
 Pac-10 Player of the Year in 1983, 1984 and 1985
 1990, Player of the Decade on the AVCA's All-Decade Team (1980s)
 Holds the Cardinal single-match record for most blocks (16)
 Voted MVP in 1995 in the National Four-Women Pro-Beach Tour

Clubs
 Stanford University (1994)
  Beşiktaş JK (women's volleyball) Istanbul (1996)

See also
 United States at the 1992 Summer Olympics

References

External links
 Play of the decade
 Stanford bio
 
 
 

1964 births
African-American volleyball players
Living people
Olympic bronze medalists for the United States in volleyball
Sportspeople from Birmingham, Alabama
Sportspeople from Palo Alto, California
Stanford Cardinal women's volleyball players
Volleyball players at the 1992 Summer Olympics
Volleyball players at the 1988 Summer Olympics
American women's volleyball players
Medalists at the 1992 Summer Olympics
Competitors at the 1994 Goodwill Games
Goodwill Games medalists in volleyball
21st-century African-American people
21st-century African-American women
20th-century African-American sportspeople
20th-century African-American women
20th-century African-American people
Pan American Games medalists in volleyball
Pan American Games bronze medalists for the United States
Medalists at the 1987 Pan American Games